Ben Tianavaig is a hill located on the Isle of Skye, near Portree . It is very prominent from Portree dominating the view from the harbour. It is a Marilyn (a hill with topographic prominence of at least 150m). It is most simply ascended from Camastianavaig. Despite its proximity to dwellings one could expect to see golden eagles and sea eagles from its ridge.

Mountains and hills of the Isle of Skye
Marilyns of Scotland